Aleta Wendo (also known as Wendo) is a town in southern Ethiopia. It is administrative center of Aleta Wendo woreda.

This town has both telephone and postal service, and is supplied with electricity by the Ethiopian Electric Power Corporation from the national grid.

History 
Dejazmach Balcha Safo, Governor of Sidamo, originally constructed his ketema or fortified camp in Wendo, but he later moved it to Hagere Selam. While passing through the area February 1909, Dr. Drake Brockman notes that the governor of Western Sidamo, Dejazmach Tessema Nadew made this town (which he calls "Alata") his headquarters.<ref>Appendix 1 to C. W. Gwynn, "A Journey in Southern Abyssinia", Geographical Journal, 38 (August 1911), p. 135</ref> American naturalists arrived at the Wendo village 29 December 1926, and camping outside the village for a while. Grazmach Kebede Dihala Mikael, the village potentate, implored them to camp near his house, explaining that there were plenty of shiftas'' or outlaws in the area.

Wendo was occupied by the Italian Laghi Division on 30 November 1936. It was retaken by the 1st Gold Coast Regiment on 22 May 1941, without a single shot fired. The Allied forces accepted the surrender of a Brigadier General and some 3,000 prisoners.

By 1958 Wendo was one of 27 places in Ethiopia ranked as First Class Township. Telephone service reached the town within the next 10 years.

Demographics 
Based on figures from the Central Statistical Agency in 2005, Aleta Wendo has an estimated total population of 20,513, of whom 10,006 were males and 10,507 were females. According to the 1994 national census, the town had a population of 11,300.

Notes 

Populated places in Ethiopia
Sidama Region
Cities and towns in Ethiopia
Ethiopia